Nelson "Nitzy" Bobb (February 25, 1924 – December 8, 2003) was an American basketball player.

Born and raised in Philadelphia, he played collegiately for hometown Temple University.

He was selected by the Philadelphia Warriors in the 1949 BAA draft and the Syracuse Nationals in the 1949 NBL draft.

He played for the Warriors (1949–53) in the NBA for 227 games.

Bobb died December 8, 2003 of cancer in Irvine, California.

External links

1924 births
2003 deaths
Deaths from cancer in California
Philadelphia Warriors draft picks
Philadelphia Warriors players
Temple Owls men's basketball players
American men's basketball players
Point guards
Basketball players from Philadelphia